The Re-Pa is the name of the association football local derby between two Belém based teams – Clube do Remo and Paysandu Sport Club. Both Remo and Paysandu fans have recognised each other as one of their biggest rivals and the derby is one of the fiercest in Brazilian football.

On May 4, 2016, the derby was declared intangible cultural heritage of the State of Pará, being qualified as a cultural expression of the people of Pará.

History

First match
The first match between the two teams happened on June 14, 1914, by the Campeonato Paraense that year. Remo won 2–1, goals from Rubilar (the first in the history of the derby) and Bayma (own goal), with Mateus scoring for the Paysandu.

Beginning of rivalry
Initially, Remo and Paysandu maintained a somewhat friendly relationship. However, this changed on January 23, 1915, when Remo's first secretary, Elzemann, sent a letter to Antônio Barros (president of the Paysandu at the time), in order to carry out a match whose income would be used to help the teams financially. The Paysandu sent a letter of reply, surrounded by insulting terms to Remo's proposal. In a second letter, the board of Paysandu accepted the challenge, without putting aside the insults and insults. The following day, Remo sent another letter to end the friendly relations between the teams. It was the beginning of one of the biggest rivalries in Brazilian football.

Statistics and records

 Biggest Remo win: 7–2, on 5 March 1939.
 Biggest Paysandu win: 7–0, on 22 July 1945.

Top scorers

Clubs' honours
These are the football honours of Remo and Paysandu.

Highest attendances

 Remo 1–0 Paysandu; 65,000 (11 July 1999); Mangueirão (neutral)
 Paysandu 1–1 Remo; 64,010 (29 April 1979); Mangueirão (neutral)
 Remo 1–0 Paysandu; 52,973 (8 April 1979); Mangueirão (neutral)
 Remo 2–1 Paysandu; 51,304 (26 August 1979); Mangueirão (neutral)

References

Brazilian football derbies
Clube do Remo
Paysandu Sport Club